Events from 2020 in Wallis and Futuna.

Incumbents 

 Administrator Superior: Thierry Queffelec
 President of the Territorial Assembly: David Vergé

Events 
Ongoing – COVID-19 pandemic in Oceania

 4 March – The territory turned away a cruise ship over fears of infection; the possibility of denying entry to another ship by the end of the month was also under consideration. Incoming flights have also been curtailed, save for those delivering essential supplies.
 23 April – The island began repatriating its 300 inhabitants stranded on New Caledonia.

Deaths

References 

Years of the 21st century in Wallis and Futuna
Wallis and Futuna